DYC may refer to:

Damned yellow composite, any yellow flower in the family Asteraceae
Dartford Youth Council, a county youth-led organisation in the United Kingdom
Defend Your Castle, a Flash game by XGen Studios
Destilerías y Crianza del Whisky S.A., a Spanish brand of whisky
Detroit Yacht Club
Department of Youth Corrections, for young offenders